Football was contested for men only at the 1970 Central American and Caribbean Games in Panama City, Panama. All matches took place at the newly constructed Estadio Rommel Fernández.

The gold medal was won by Cuba for the third time, who earned 6 points in the final stage.

Results

Group 1
A 2 point system used.

Group 2
A 2 point system used.

Final stage
A 2 point system used.

Colombia won 3-0, but the result was later awarded to Venezuela 2-0

Colombia won 1-0, but the result was later awarded to Cuba 2-0 when Cuba protested against Colombian players Pedro Zape and Armando Torres for being professionals; in fact, it was discovered that Zape indeed was, and therefore, on 12 March the "Tribunal de Honor de los XI Juegos Centroamericanos y del Caribe" decided to award the match to Cuba 2-0.

Apparently, due to a misunderstanding (hour change), the Antilleans did not show up to play in the morning, but instead in the afternoon of March 13. Colombia was present in the morning, but not in the afternoon as the game was originally scheduled. Curiously, the same referee who gave the victory to Colombia in the morning also gave a win to the Netherlands Antilles in the afternoon. Finally the "Tribunal de Honor" made a Solomonic decision, Colombia was awarded a 2-0 result in its match against the Netherlands Antilles and with these results, Cuba obtained the Gold medal, the Netherlands Antilles the Silver medal on goal difference and Colombia the Bronze medal.
There are versions that affirm that Colombia was expelled from the tournament after the Cuban protest, but they fall into contradictions because in the medal table Colombia was awarded the bronze medal. Everything indicates that Colombia was not expelled, they only lost the games in which they used professional players against Cuba and Venezuela respectively with the score of 2-0, but won the game against the Netherlands Antilles by forfeit with the score of 2-0.

Statistics

Goalscorers

References

External links
 

1970 Central American and Caribbean Games
1970